The Sulawesi serpent eagle (Spilornis rufipectus) is a species of bird of prey in the family Accipitridae. It is endemic to Sulawesi in Indonesia. Its natural habitat is subtropical or tropical moist lowland forest.

References

Spilornis
Sulawesi serpent eagle
Sulawesi serpent eagle
Birds described in 1858
Taxonomy articles created by Polbot